Michael Grant (born December 21, 1940) is an American author. He is a 23-year veteran of the NYPD and a former security director.

Bibliography
Line of Duty (1992)
Officer Down (1994)
Retribution (1996)
The Cove (2011)
Back To Venice (2011)
When I Come Home (2011)
Dear Son, Hey Ma (2011)
In The Time Of Famine (2011)
Krystal (2011)
Precinct (2012)
Who Moved My Friggin' Provolone? (2011)
Appropriate Sanctions (2011)
Stalker (2011)
A Letter To Ballyturan (2014)

References

American male writers
American fiction writers
1940 births
Living people